Sclerothamnus is a genus of glass sponges in the family Tretodictyidae.

References

External links
https://ispecies.org/?q=Sclerothamnus

Hexactinellida
Animals described in 1875
Sponge genera